Espero may mean:

Daewoo Espero, a car made by the South Korean company Daewoo Motors.
La Espero, an Esperanto poem written by L. L. Zamenhof.
Espero, a Slovak publishing house for Esperanto literature.
Battle of the Espero Convoy, a naval battle in the Mediterranean during WWII.